Best of Friends is the debut album by American R&B band Twennynine, released in October 1979 on Elektra Records. The album reached No. 15 on the Billboard Top R&B Albums chart.

Overview
Best of Friends was produced by Lenny White and Larry Dunn.

Singles
The single, "Peanut Butter", reached number 3 on the Billboard Hot Soul Singles chart.

Track listing
 "Citi Dancin'" (Lenny White, Barry Johnson) - 4:24
 "Take Me or Leave Me" (Eddie Martinez) - 4:00
 "Best of Friends" (Lenny White, Danall Miller, Leslie Rene) - 3:52
 "Peanut Butter" (Donald Blackmon) - 3:37
 "Betta" (Barry Johnson) - 4:18
 "Morning Sunrise" (Donald Blackmon) - 3:18
 "Oh Sylvie" (Danall Miller, Valmon Burke) - 3:42
 "Tropical Nights" (Lenny White) - 5:11

Personnel
Don Blackman   - vocals
Larry Dunn - producer
Eddie Martinez - guitar
Denzil Miller  - keyboards
Twennynine - primary artist
Lenny White - drums, producer
Lynn Davis - backing vocals
 Paulinho Da Costa - special percussion

References

1979 debut albums
Elektra Records albums
Twennynine albums
Albums produced by Lenny White